In computable analysis, Weihrauch reducibility is a notion of reducibility between multi-valued functions on represented spaces that roughly captures the uniform computational strength of computational problems. It was originally introduced by Klaus Weihrauch in an unpublished 1992 technical report.

Definition 

A represented space is a pair  of a set   and a surjective partial function .

Let  be represented spaces and let  be a partial multi-valued function. Intuitively, a realizer  for  behaves "just like " but it works on names. If  is a realizer for  we write .

Let  be represented spaces and let  be partial multi-valued functions. Very often, in the literature we find  written as a binary function, so to avoid the use of the join. The maps  are often called forward and backward functional respectively.

In symbols:

See also 
 Wadge reducibility

References 

Computable analysis